Diphasiastrum alpinum, the alpine clubmoss, is a species of clubmoss. It was first described by Carl Linnaeus in his Flora Lapponica, 1737, from specimens obtained in Finland.

Distribution
It has a circumpolar distribution across much of the northern parts of the Northern Hemisphere: much of Canada, the northwestern United States, northern and central Europe, Russia, China and Japan. It is an indicator of alpine tundra and boreal climates. It is found in mountains and moors often with Calluna and grasses.

Description
The leaves are hollow at the bases. The female stems produce strobili up to long.

Diphasiastrum alpinum may hybridize with Diphasiastrum sitchense.

References

External links
United States Department of Agriculture, Plants Profile

alpinum
Flora of Europe
Flora of Asia
Plants described in 1753
Taxa named by Carl Linnaeus
Flora of North America